Margeride (in Auvergnat ) is a mountainous region of France, situated in the Massif Central, inside the départements of Cantal, Haute-Loire and Lozère.

Location
In Cantal, its western boundary is the Truyère, and its eastern boundary, in Haute-Loire, by the gorges of the river Allier. To the south, in Lozère, It is the Lot which delimits the region.

Geology
The lithology of area is manly granitoids and gneiss. The highest peaks are the Signal de Randon at 1,551 metres and the Mont Mouchet at 1,465 metres.

Other details
In the 18th century the Margeride was terrorised by the Beast of Gévaudan. The beast of Gévaudan was a French legend, that supposedly takes on the appearance of a large wolf like creature. This creature is fabled to be very powerful and possessive almost like a demonic spirit. A normal man or woman (human) can open their bodies up to be possessed by the beast of Gévaudan by drinking the water out of the footprint of a wolf, they must drink the water straight off the ground during a full moon. Once the spirit of  took possession of the persons body they would experience memory blanks, loss of time which they cannot account for, fuge states, aggression, confusion, delusions and hallucinations. Supposedly  was born from a continued line of werewolves, where the male of each generation would have the wolf gene in their DNA and during a blood moon they would pass on the wolf power through a bite. La Bête was first fabled to be in the body of a man named Jeziah Lou-Silvré and his sister was the one who killed him with a single spear crafted from mountain ash and mistletoe. The spirit of La Bête is the most powerful legend in France and when someone drinks the water from the print of a wolf and becomes La Bête their person gradually ceases to exist, their memories, their very essence is replaced by that of Jeziah Lou-Silvré and his spirit seeks vengeance on all hunters and descendants of his sister (the bloodline of Lou-Silvré), the name Silvré can be translated to mean Silver which is coincidentally the fabled element capable of killing a werewolf, however silver doesn't kill a wolf but simply weakens it...La Bête went after the modern descendants of his family who had the names of Silver, Silvré, Argent, Silgente. Jeziahs' sister was also known as the Maid of Gévaudan.

The area was a stronghold of the French Resistance in the Second World War. It was from here that the Resistance worked to delay German reinforcements travelling north after the D-Day landings.

Today the area contains a museum of ecology, and a park with a herd of rare European Bison.

References

External links

 at France for Visitors
 Margeride at the Lozère Tourist Board website

Massif Central
Landforms of Haute-Loire
Landforms of Lozère
Landforms of Cantal
Mountain ranges of Auvergne-Rhône-Alpes
Mountain ranges of Occitania (administrative region)